Donald "XL" Robertson is an American hip-hop recording artist, record producer and entrepreneur, born and raised in New Orleans.

Background

Donald XL Robertson was exposed to soul, Funk &  Jazz music at a very young age raised in The Big Easy a city known for its rich jazz and Bounce music heritage.  He was introduced to Hip Hop by his parents Donald "Duck" Robertson Sr.& Barbara Robertson when they brought home "Rappers Delight" by The Sugarhill Gang. XL's original Rap name was DJ Jazzy D, although he had already changed it to XL after he had joined BIg Boogie to form the New Orleans-based rap group Strictly Business. He chose the name would always say "why do anything if your not going to do it Xtra Large" (sic)

Collaborations
Donald XL Robertson has produced and performed for many groups and solo artists since the mid 1990s. These include notable tracks for artist such as Master P.  ("Where Do We Go From Here feat: Nas", "Say Brah!","Get Back feat: Curren$y tha Hottspitta","Doubles Check Em feat: Traci aka Patrick Bateman", "Roll How We Roll ft Afficial") Silkk the Shocker ("He Did That Silkk The Shocker", "What's Heaven Like ft Jabo" "That's Just Me ft DJ Break") C-Murder ("Forever Tru", "Watch'Em ft Trick Daddy", "I'm Not Just ft Soulja Slim","Radio Version of "Down 4 my N's ft Snoop Dogg originally produced by KLC", "Ballers ft T-Bo", "Young Thugs ft The Ghetto Commission", "Ride ft Samm") 504 Boyz ("Wobble Wobble ft Mystikal, C-Murder, Silkk the Shocker & Magic") Mia X ("He Wanna Pay For it", "Get Crunked Up ft Lil Jon & The Eastside Boys","Verbal Assault ft DJ Cheese", "Forgive Me ft Collage", "Born With the Bomb", "Iz yall Having That") Juvenile ("Nolia Clap" ft Wacko & Skip", "Nolia Clap Remix ft Slim Thug, Bun B, & T.I.", "Get Ya Hustle On") Mos Def ("Dollar Day aka Katrina Clap") Curren$y ("In The Booth", "Strip Club Girls","I Got A Story To Tell", "Grind N") Kanary Diamonds ("I'm Killin' Em ft Stan The Guitarman", "Mirror Mirror", "Paparrazzi", "Number One, "Destiny, "I Rock", "Could it Be", "Have Some Fun") Brandy Norwood" Camouflage Remix and many more.[]

Discography
Solo albums
 "That's The Business" (2005)
"He Did That Instrumental Volume 1" (2005)
"It's Like This" (2007)
"Strickly Business" (2008)
"Strickly Business Reloaded" (2009)
"Jumpin Porches" (2009)
"Amplified" (2009)
"Lookin 4 A Grown Woman" (2010)
"Be Free" (2011)
"The Un-Intelligent" (2011)

Remixes
 "Camouflage" Remix by Brandy (2009)
 "I Get It In" Remix by Omarion ft Gucci Mane (2009)
 "Professional" Remix by Play ft Ray J & Chyna Whyte (2009)
 "Camouflage" Remix by Brandy ft Lok Akim (2009)
 "Camouflage" Remix by Brandy ft Mia X (2009)
 "I Am" by Mary J. Blige additional production by Brigg Sterns (2009)
 "I Am" by Mary J. Blige ft Mia X additional production by Brigg Sterns (2009)
 "To be Real" by Mary J. Blige ft Mia X (2009)

Collaboration albums
 "The Christmas Collection" (Andre Mieux) (2012)
 "I'm Looking for a Grown Woman" (Donald XL Robertson) (2010)
 "I Rise" (Lok Akim) (2009)
 "Mirror Mirror" (Kanary Diamonds) (2009)
 "Off Top" (VA Streetz)  (2009)
 "Hateful Girls" (Mis. Led!) (2009)
 "I'm Killin'em (Kanary Diamonds) (2008)
 "It Is What It Is" (Impromp2) (2008)
 "Ironnman" (Action Figures) (2007)
 "Kids Creative Movement" (Hip Hop Mimi) (2007)
 "Do What I Want" (Andrea Lewis of Degrassi) (2007)
 "I Got A Message To Say" (Hip Hop Mimi) (2007)
 "Could It Be" (Kanary Diamonds) (2007)
 "I Rock" (Kanary Diamonds) (2007)
 "The Tru Story: Continued" C-Murder (2006)
 "Start The Conversation" (The Movement) (2006)
 "Reality Check" Juvenile (2006)
 "No Limit Greatest Hits" (Various Artist) (2006)
 "The Truest Shit I Ever Said" C-Murder (2005)
 "Syrenz" (Syrenz) (2005)
 "The Source Presents: Hip Hop Hits, Vol. 10 (Various Artists) (2005)
 "The Best of Silkk the Shocker" Silkk the Shocker (2005)
 "Rush The Dance Floor" (Katie Marino) (2005)
 "Goodbye So Long" (Katie Marino) (2005)
 "Runaway" (Katie Marino) (2005)
 "Follow Me" (Katie Marino) (2005)
 "Instrument Of Praise" (Erica Fox) (2005)
 "All Things" (Erica Fox) (2005)
 "The Game Of Love" (Erin Thompkins) (2005)
 "The Return" (The Legendary G.H.O.S.T.) (2005)
 "Nocona Stomp" (Wild Turkey) (2005)
 "Nolia Clap" (UTP Playas) (2004)
 "Good Side, Bad Side" Master P (2004)
 "Good Side Bad Side [Bonus DVD] Master P (2004)
 "Beginning of the End..." (Juvenile/Skip/Wacko) (2004)
 "Based On A True Story" Silkk The Shocker (2004)
 "Straight from the N.O." Choppa (2003)
 "Storm" (Tru Thug) (2003)
 "Project Gotham Racing, Vol. 2:" (Original Soundtrack) (2003)
 "Malibu's Most Wanted" (Original Soundtrack) (2003)
 "Life As A Mack" Ke'noe (2002)
 "Years Later" Soulja Slim (2002)
 "Tru Dawgs" C-Murder (2002)
 "Ballers" 504 Boyz (2002)
 "Ballers" [Bonus DVD]  504 Boyz (2002)
 "Training Day" (Original Soundtrack) (2001)
 "The Streets Made Me" Soulja Slim (2001)
 "My World, My Way" Silkk the Shocker (2001)
 "Game Face" Master P (2001)
 "C-P-3.com" C-Murder (2001)
 "Breather Life" (Krazy) (2001)
 "Trapped In Crime" C-Murder (2000)
 "Time for Da Real (Wild Boyz) (2000)
 "Goodfellas" 504 Boyz (2000)
 "Ghetto Postage" Master P (2000)
 "Brick Livin'" Mr. Marcelo (2000)
 "World War III" Mac (1999)
 "Only God Can Judge Me" Master P (1999)

References
 Billboard.com 
Donald XL Robertson donates album to ARP
 Allmusic.com 
 Discogs.com

Website 
DonaldXLRobertson.com 

1973 births
Living people
Record producers from Louisiana
American hip hop record producers
African-American rappers
21st-century American rappers
21st-century African-American musicians
20th-century African-American people